Parasa hampsoni is a moth of the family Limacodidae first described by Harrison Gray Dyar Jr. in 1894. It is found in Sri Lanka.

References

Moths of Asia
Moths described in 1894
Limacodidae